The Collective Knowledge (CK) project is an open-source framework and repository to enable collaborative, reproducible and sustainable research and development of complex computational systems. CK is a small, portable, customizable and decentralized infrastructure helping researchers and practitioners:

 share their code, data and models as reusable Python components and automation actions with unified JSON API, JSON meta information, and a UID based on FAIR principles
 assemble portable workflows from shared components (such as multi-objective autotuning and Design space exploration)
 automate, crowdsource and reproduce benchmarking of complex computational systems
 unify predictive analytics (scikit-learn, R, DNN)
 enable reproducible and interactive papers

Notable usages
 ARM uses CK to accelerate computer engineering
Association for Computing Machinery evaluates CK for possible integration with the ACM Digital Library sponsored by the Sloan Foundation and for reproducible research
 Several ACM-sponsored conferences use CK for the Artifact Evaluation process
Imperial College (London) uses CK to automate and crowdsource compiler bug detection
 Researchers from the University of Cambridge used CK to help the community reproduce results of their publication in the International Symposium on Code Generation and Optimization (CGO'17) during Artifact Evaluation
 General Motors (USA) uses CK to crowd-benchmark convolutional neural network optimizations 
 The Raspberry Pi Foundation and the cTuning foundation released a CK workflow with a reproducible "live" paper to enable collaborative research into multi-objective autotuning and machine learning techniques
 IBM uses CK to reproduce Quantum results from Nature
 CK is used to automate MLPerf benchmark

Portable package manager for portable workflows
CK has an integrated cross-platform package manager with Python scripts, JSON API and JSON meta-description to automatically rebuild software environment on a user machine required to run a given research workflow.

Reproducibility of experiments
CK enables reproducibility of experimental results via community involvement similar to Wikipedia and physics. Whenever a new workflow with all components is shared via GitHub, anyone can try it on a different machine, with different environment and using slightly different choices (compilers, libraries, data sets). Whenever an unexpected or wrong behavior is encountered, the community explains it, fixes components and shares them back as described in.

References

External links
 Development site: 
 Documentation: 
 Public repository with crowdsourced experiments: 
 International Workshop on Adaptive Self-tuning Computing System (ADAPT) uses CK to enable public reviewing of publications and artifacts via Reddit: 

Workflow applications
Build automation